Kyre may refer to:
 Kyre, a village in England
 Kyre College, a former school in Australia

KYRE may refer to:
 KYRE-LP, a low-power radio station (104.1 FM) licensed to serve Mansfield, Texas, United States
 KSYC-FM, a radio station (103.9 FM) licensed to serve Yreka, California, United States

See also 
 Kire (disambiguation)
 Kyree, given name